Demotina modesta is a species of leaf beetle. It is an adventive species in the southeastern United States in North America, while its native range includes Japan and Korea. It is very abundant on oaks. It is known to be parthenogenetic in part of its native range, and no males are known from North America.

Biology
Demotina modesta is a summer breeder and probably hibernates as larvae or pupae. It lays eggs singly on the undersides of leaves and covers them with excrement.

References

Further reading

External links

 

Eumolpinae
Articles created by Qbugbot
Beetles of Asia
Beetles of North America
Beetles described in 1874
Taxa named by Joseph Sugar Baly